Tarana Halim (born 16 August 1966) is a Bangladeshi politician, former lawyer, television and film actress and playwright. In January 2018, she was appointed as the State Minister of Information. Earlier, she served as the state minister of the Post and Telecommunications Division under the Ministry of Posts, Telecommunications and Information Technology of the Government of Bangladesh since July 2014.

Career
She first came into limelight in 1976 by emerging as the champion in Notun Kuri, a popular children reality show of Bangladesh Television.
Halim got her break-through in acting by working in the TV  plays Sneho and Dhakaye Thaki.

Halim served as the general secretary of Bangabandhu Sangskritik Jote, a cultural organization.

On March 20, 2009, Halim was elected Member of Parliament of one of the 45 reserved women seats.

Personal life
Halim is married to actor Ahmed Rubel.

Works
 Golapi Ekhon Traine (1978)
 Julekha's Ghar (1996)
 Abar Ekti Jhuddo Chai (1999)
 Jibon Jekhane Jemon

References

External links
 

Living people
1966 births
People from Chittagong
20th-century Bangladeshi actresses
Bangladeshi female models
Awami League politicians
Women members of the Jatiya Sangsad
Women government ministers of Bangladesh
Bangladeshi film actresses
Bangladeshi television actresses
Bangladeshi actor-politicians
State Ministers of Information (Bangladesh)
State Ministers of Posts, Telecommunications and Information Technology
9th Jatiya Sangsad members
10th Jatiya Sangsad members
Best TV Actress Meril-Prothom Alo Critics Choice Award winners
21st-century Bangladeshi women politicians